Geronimo is a populated place located on Highway 70 between Bylas and Fort Thomas, west of Safford in Graham County, Arizona, United States.

History
Geronimo was named after the famous Apache chief Goyaalé, better known as Geronimo. Camp Thomas, the U. S. Cavalry began its management of the Apache Indian Reservation along the Gila River, was originally located here in 1876.  The camp was later moved east to what is now Fort Thomas.  Geronimo was once a stop on the Arizona Eastern Railway and had an operating US Post Office from April 30, 1896, until May 31, 1956.

References

External links
 Geromino – ghosttowns.com

Ghost towns in Arizona
Former populated places in Graham County, Arizona
History of Graham County, Arizona
Forts in Arizona
1876 establishments in Arizona Territory